Miss Europe 1937 was the tenth annual Miss Europe pageant and the ninth under French journalist Maurice de Waleffe. With withdraws from most of the countries maybe due to the beginning of World War II.

Results

Placements

Delegates
 – José Decœur
 – Britta Wikström
 – Tove Arni 
 – Jacqueline Janet
 – Lisbeth Grung
 – Jozefa Kaczmarkiewicz
 (In exile) – Anna Betoulinski
 – Ambarina De Los Reyes
 – Jacqueline Reyboubet

Notes
Did not Compete:
 – Elsie Schimpf (no permission from her mother)

References

External links

1937 in Europe
1937 in Algeria
Miss Europe